Huancaya District is one of thirty-three districts of the province Yauyos in Peru.

Geography 
The Cordillera Central traverses the district. Some of the highest mountains of the district are listed below:

See also 
 Papaqucha

References